The Grace or The Graces may refer to:

Charites of Greek mythology
The Grace (group), a South Korean girl group
The Graces (band), a late 1980s and early 1990s American band
"The Grace" (song), a 2005 song by Neverending White Lights
The Graces (Ireland), a series of proposed reforms in 17th century Ireland

See also
Grace (disambiguation)